Fantasia Holdings Group Company Limited is a leading property developer in China. It operates in five segments: property development, property investment, property operation services, property agency services and hotel services. Its other operations include provision of tourism and entertainment services, and interior design services.

History
The Group first commenced its property development business in Shenzhen in 1996, which was established by Miss Zeng Jie, the niece of the China's former vice-president, Zeng Qinghong. In 2009, its shares were listed on the Hong Kong Stock Exchange with IPO price of HK$2.2 per share.

On 5 October 2021, Fantasia Holdings missed a payment on a USD$206 million bond that had matured the day before, triggering a default. Just weeks prior, the developer had assured investors it had "no liquidity issue". This resulted in fears of contagion from the Evergrande liquidity crisis.

See also

 Evergrande liquidity crisis

References

External links
Fantasia Holdings Group Company Limited 

Companies listed on the Hong Kong Stock Exchange
Real estate companies established in 1996
Companies based in Shenzhen
Real estate companies of China
Privately held companies of China
1996 establishments in China